{{Infobox person
| name            = Asami Kai
| image           = http://1.bp.blogspot.com/_lLsdaCVk3Kk/St_Vjs8JdII/AAAAAAABRCY/K1tOuZIo3lk/s1600-h/AsamiKai17.jpg
| caption         = Asami Kai as Urara Ozu/MagiBlue in Mahou Sentai Magiranger
| birth_name      = 
| birth_date      = 
| birth_place     = Kumamoto, Japan
| height = 163 cm
| death_date      = 
| death_place     = 
| alias           = 
| homepage        = 
| years_active     = 2005-2009
}}
 (born January 9, 1987) is a Japanese actress & gravure idol.

 Television 
 Mahou Sentai Magiranger (2005, TV Asahi) - Urara Ozu/MagiBlue
 Gakincho - Return Kids - (2006, TBS-TV)
 Joshi Ana Icchokusen! (2007, TV Tokyo)

 Films 
 Mahou Sentai Magiranger, the Movie "The Bride of Infersia" (2005, Toei) - Urara Ozu/MagiBlue
 Chō Ninja Tai Inazuma! (2006, Toei) - Kaguya/Shiden
 Magiranger VS Dekaranger'' (2006, Toei) - Urara Ozu/MagiBlue

External links 
Official Blog(in Japanese only)
Official Home Page(in Japanese only)
Natural Smile 21st Asami Free Full Length Video of her Gravure Video

1987 births
Living people
Japanese gravure idols
Japanese actresses
People from Kumamoto